The 2023 AMA Supercross Championship is the 50th season of off-road stadium motorcycle racing in the United States. Comprising 17 rounds, the series will run from January until May, crowning supercross champions in both the 250cc and 450cc classes, concluding with the Salt Lake City round on May 13.

The championship will form the first part of the inaugural SuperMotocross World Championship.

Schedule and results

Stadium locations

450 SX

Entry list

Championship Standings

250 SX West

Entry list

Championship Standings

250 SX East

Entry list

Championship Standings

References

External links
 

AMA Supercross Championship
AMA Supercross
AMA Supercross